Aomori is a city in Japan.

Aomori may also refer to:
 Aomori Prefecture, Japan

Companies
 Aomori Bank
 Aomori Broadcasting Corporation
 Aomori FM Broadcasting
 Aomori Television

Schools
 Aomori High School
 Aomori Junior College
 Aomori Public University
 Aomori University
 Aomori University of Health and Welfare

Sports
 Aomori Stadium
 Aomori Velodrome
 Aomori Wat's, a Japanese professional basketball team
 ReinMeer Aomori FC, a Japanese football (soccer) club based in Aomori, Japan
 Team Aomori, a women's curling team in Aomori, Japan

Transportation
 Aomori Airport
 Aomori Bay Bridge
 Aomori Expressway
 Aomori Station

Other
 Aomori (meteorite) a 1984 meteorite fall in Tohoku, Japan

People with the surname
Shin Aomori, Japanese voice actor

Japanese-language surnames